Shard Bishop is a mutant fictional character appearing in American comic books published by Marvel Comics.

Fictional character biography
Shard was a Lieutenant in Xavier's Security Enforcers (X.S.E.) with her older brother Lucas Bishop in their native timeline in the 2080s. She is the daughter of mutant Indigenous Australian refugees (their ancestor is the mutant Gateway) who fled Australia for America the day before it was devastated in a nuclear attack. Shard was born and raised in a mutant concentration camp, in which mutants were branded over their right eyes with the letter "M" for recognition. In Uncanny X-Men Annual #17, Shard is stated as having the mutant ability of "transubbing ambient light into concussive force".

Shard became the youngest X.S.E. graduate a year after Bishop attained that position. She served under Bishop as a member of the Omega Squad (which included Bishop and his officers, Randall and Malcolm), until her promotion.

Together, in the X.S.E. Shard and Bishop were responsible for apprehending criminal mutants. Shard was partially infected on a mission with her brother fighting a group infected with a vampire-like affliction originating from the present day mutant, Emplate.

Although Emplates are considered the "living dead", Bishop took her to the New York Stark/Fujikawa building inhabited by the Witness in order to attempt to save her life by transmitting her essence into a holographic matrix (a technology of Shi'ar origin, akin to that used in the X-Men's Danger Room). Here he was said to have made a deal in order for the experiment to even happen in the first place, the price being that he would work for him for a specified period of time. The experiment was a success, but Shard, already partially infected with the Emplate affliction, died. Due to the process involved, Bishop considered himself her murderer. The extent of, as well as the type of work he did in this deal is still yet to be known, if it ever will be.

Bishop eventually travelled back in time, to the present, in an effort to track down Trevor Fitzroy, one of his time's most-wanted criminals and Shard's ex-lover, where he became stuck in the present day and became a member of the X-Men, his idols. Shard has also since been recreated in the present, as a computer construct, and became a clandestine member of the government-sponsored X-Factor team. There, she began a romantic relationship with her teammate Wildchild.

After X-Factor disbanded in X-Factor #149, Shard was transported into an alternate future. There she died for the second and apparently final time, saving her brother Bishop from Trevor Fitzroy. Her former paramour had attempted to seduce her by restoring her body to its original solid form.

Powers and abilities
Shard is able to absorb ambient light particles and convert/transsub it to allow her to perform a number of light based attacks. During Shard's condition living as a photon based life form, she is granted a form of intangibility.

Reception
 In 2014, Entertainment Weekly ranked Shard 75th in their "Let's rank every X-Man ever" list.

In other media

Television 
 Shard appears in the X-Men episodes "One Man's Worth" pt. 1 & 2 and "Beyond Good and Evil" pt. 1-4. She was voiced by Kay Tremblay.

Video games
 In X-Men: Mojo World she is a playable character after unlocked in level 4.

References

External links
 World of Black Heroes: Shard Biography
Uncannyxmen.net character bio on Shard

Australian superheroes
Characters created by John Romita Jr.
Characters created by Scott Lobdell
Comics characters introduced in 1994
Fictional characters who can manipulate light
Fictional characters who can turn intangible
Fictional indigenous people of Australia
Marvel Comics female superheroes
Marvel Comics mutants
Marvel Comics orphans
X-Factor (comics)
Fictional lieutenants
Fictional female lieutenants